France competed at the inaugural Winter Paralympic Games in 1976 in Örnsköldsvik, Sweden. France's twenty athletes took part in both sporting events: cross-country skiing and alpine skiing. With five medals, of which two gold, France finished eighth on the medal table.

Medallists

Alpine skiing 

France’s alpine skiing team consisted in one woman (Micheline Perrin) and ten men (Remy Arnod, Bernard Baudean, Hubert Dussol, Claude Ebner, Marcel Girod, Patrick Knaff, Louis Loison, André Miegebielle, Pierre Nougaret and Marcel Perrin). All of France's medals were won in alpine skiing. (See above)

Cross-country skiing 

France’s cross-country skiing team consisted in three women (Catherine Billon, Françoise Billon and Claudette Thomassey) and six men (Guy Bertrand, Raymond Calitka, Robert Dutron, René Pernod, Fernad Perrissin-Faber and Jean Place).

See also
France at the 1976 Winter Olympics

References

External links
International Paralympic Committee official website

Nations at the 1976 Winter Paralympics
1976
Paralympics